Ma Foi Strategic Consultants is a global management consulting firm headquartered in Chennai; offering Strategic Consulting, Research and Education services.

It was founded in 2012 as an evolution of the Ma Foi brand in India.

History

Branding of Ma Foi : 1992 - 2012
The inception of the brand 'Ma Foi' (pronounced "Ma Fwa") was in 1992 as "Ma Foi Management Consultants Ltd", a Chennai based HR service provider founded by K. Pandiarajan to tap into opportunities arising out of the 1991 economic liberalization policies in India.

On choosing the French name, the founder commented in an interview - "We were targeting the international market. So, Ma Foi -- or My Word -- symbolized what we wanted to say and do."

In 2004, Vedior NV, a Dutch head hunting firm acquired a majority stake in Ma Foi Management Consultants, to develop its business in South-East Asia and West Asia. Three years later, Randstad Holding NV acquired the operations of Ma Foi, through its December 2007 US$5.14 billion acquisition of Vedior. In April 2012, "Randstad India" replaced Ma Foi, which by then had become a brand in the professional recruitment space.

Evolution of Ma Foi Strategic Consultants: 2012 - till date
With Ma Foi, the founders gained a service spectrum that extended beyond recruitment especially in strategic consultancy; and on 5 April 2012, they announced that brand Ma Foi would exit from HR consulting services with the launch of a new venture focusing on management consulting and education space - Ma Foi Strategic Consultants Pvt. Ltd.

The venture will have investments of over INR 25 crore in the first three years. The new company got into an agreement with Randstad for using the brand Ma Foi for three years. Eventually, the brand would be bought over, depending on the legal approvals.

The company would set up two business management schools by 2013 end— in Chennai and Madurai. The eventual plan is to start a chain of management schools on a franchisee model.

Organisation and operations
It is headquartered in Chennai, and employs over 50 employees. It is currently planning to acquire three to four companies and will open eight offices across the country.

Marketing and branding 
Ma Foi marketing campaigns have the slogan "From Managing People to Knowledge".

Services
The company is in three verticals,

 Management consulting
 Research : Research and analytical organisation 
 Education : management education and professional development

See also
 Ma Foi Management Consultants

References

Indian companies established in 2012
Management consulting firms of India
Financial services companies based in Chennai
2012 establishments in Tamil Nadu